Willy Dullens is a former Dutch football player who played for RKSV Sittardia and the Netherlands national football team but his career was cut short due to injury. In 1966, uniquely while playing in the Eerste Divisie, he was chosen as the Dutch Footballer of the Year.

References

1945 births
Living people
Dutch footballers
Fortuna Sittard non-playing staff
Netherlands international footballers
People from Sittard
Sportspeople from Limburg (Netherlands)
Association football forwards
Footballers from Limburg (Netherlands)
Fortuna Sittard players